{{DISPLAYTITLE:C23H34O3}}
The molecular formula C23H34O3 (molar mass: 358.51 g/mol, exact mass: 358.2508 u) may refer to:

 AM-905
 AM-906 
 Pregnenolone acetate
 Testosterone butyrate, or testosterone butanoate
 Testosterone isobutyrate